Luca Bastian Plogmann (born 10 March 2000) is a German professional footballer who plays as a goalkeeper for Eredivisie club Go Ahead Eagles.

Career
Aged 18, Plogmann received his first call-up to Werder Bremen's first team squad for a match against Wormatia Worms on 18 August 2018 in the first round of the DFB-Pokal with three of the side's other goalkeepers, Stefanos Kapino, Michael Zetterer and Jaroslav Drobný, injured. He made his professional debut on 1 September in a Bundesliga match against Eintracht Frankfurt. He was brought onto the field after first-choice goalkeeper Jiří Pavlenka injured himself while conceding a penalty.

In August 2020, Plogmann extended his contract with Werder Bremen and joined 3. Liga side SV Meppen, managed by former Werder Bremen player Torsten Frings, on a season-long loan. He started the season as Meppen's first-choice goalkeeper, but suffered a severe knee injury on his 8th appearance for the club in a match against Dynamo Dresden on 31 October 2020 and was ruled out for several months after undergoing surgery. As a result, the loan was cut short in February 2021 and Plogmann returned to Werder Bremen to continue his rehabilitation.

On 17 October 2022, Plogmann joined Eredivisie club Go Ahead Eagles on a one-year contract. He was signed as a replacement for the injured Jeffrey de Lange and Erwin Mulder.

References

External links
 
 

2000 births
Living people
Footballers from Bremen
German footballers
Association football goalkeepers
Germany youth international footballers
Olympic footballers of Germany
Footballers at the 2020 Summer Olympics
Bundesliga players
Regionalliga players
SV Werder Bremen players
SV Werder Bremen II players
SV Meppen players
Go Ahead Eagles players
German expatriate footballers
Expatriate footballers in the Netherlands
German expatriate sportspeople in the Netherlands